Florian Bague (born 27 July 1984) is a French former professional footballer who played as a goalkeeper.

Career
Bague was born in Besançon. He began his career at CO Châlons. In 2005, he joined Ligue 2 side US Boulogne and spent seven years playing for the club until June 2012.

External links 
 
 

Living people
1984 births
Sportspeople from Besançon
French footballers
Association football goalkeepers
Ligue 1 players
Ligue 2 players
Championnat National players
Championnat National 2 players
CO Châlons players
US Boulogne players
Luçon FC players
Calais RUFC players
Footballers from Bourgogne-Franche-Comté